The Australian Institute of Sport (AIS) is a high performance sports training institution in Australia. The Institute's  headquarters were opened in 1981 and are situated in the northern suburb of Bruce, Canberra. The AIS is a division of the Australian Sports Commission (ASC), part of the Australian Government under the Department of Health and Aged Care.

History

Two reports were the basis for developing the AIS: The Role, Scope and Development of Recreation in Australia (1973) by John Bloomfield and Report of the Australian Sports Institute Study Group (1975) (group chaired by Allan Coles). The need for the AIS was compounded in 1976 when the Australian Olympic team failed to win a gold medal at the Montreal Olympics, which was regarded as a national embarrassment for Australia. The institute's well-funded programs (and more generally the generous funding for elite sporting programs by Australian and State Governments) have been regarded as a major reason for Australia's recent success in international sporting competitions.

In 2011, Minister for Sport Mark Arbib announced the AIS would take responsibility for the strategic direction of high performance sport in Australia. In November 2012, the ASC released "Australia's Winning Edge 2012–2022", a high performance sport plan, which highlighted a new role for the AIS particularly in terms of developing coaches and talent identification but not directly managing national sports organisations elite athlete programs as it had done since 1981.

Timeline 
A brief overview of the history of the AIS follows.

Institute
The AIS employs a number of staff who primarily work in Sports Science and Sports Medicine, which includes disciplines such as sports nutrition, performance analysis, skill acquisition, physiology, recovery, biomechanics, athlete career education, strength and conditioning, psychology, physical therapies, talent identification, and applied performance research.

There are a number of sculptures located throughout the Bruce Campus, such as 'Acrobats', 'Gymnast', 'Pole Vaulter' and 'Soccer Players'  by John Robinson and the 'Swimmer' by Guy Boyd. After the Sydney 2000 Olympics, two of the three sculptures  - ' Gymnast' and 'Wheelchair Basketballer' - that were located on the Sydney Tower Eye prior to the Olympics were installed at the AIS.

The AIS Arena is a 5,200 capacity indoor stadium which has been used for sports such as basketball, gymnastics and volleyball as well as music concerts. Directly adjacent to, but not strictly part of the institute is the 25,000 capacity outdoor Canberra Stadium which has hosted matches of all the major forms of football played in Australia.

In 2005, 2009, and 2010 the institute won awards at the prestigious Canberra and Capital Region Tourism Awards. These awards were given in recognition of the daily public tours that are available. Each tour, which takes in several different buildings of the institute as well as the arena and the Sportex zone, is led by an athlete currently training there.

Logo

Shortly after its inception in 1981, the AIS held a competition for a symbol that would depict the AIS aim of "achieving supremacy in sport". Over 500 designs were submitted. The winner was Rose-Marie Derrico, a design student from Bendigo, Victoria. Her design showed an athlete with hands clasped above the head in recognition of victory. The colours of the logo were red, white and blue, which are the same colours as the Australian flag.

On 3 February 2014, the AIS launched a new logo in line with its new direction as outlined in its Winning Edge program that was launched in 2012. Landor Associates designed the new brand and logo. The gold in the brand representing Australia's pursuit of gold.

National Training Centres
From 2014, as a result of Australia's Winning Edge 2012-2023 strategy, the AIS no longer directly offered scholarships to athletes. As a result of the strategy, many national sporting organisations are utilizing the AIS facilities and services on an ongoing or regular basis. Several national sports organisations have located their national centres for excellence at the AIS. These include: Basketball Australia Centre for Excellence, Netball Australia Centre for Excellence Football Federation of Australia Centre of Excellence, Rowing Australia National Training Centre, Volleyball Australia Centre of Excellence and Swimming Australia National Training Centre.

The AIS does continue to support other athletes in other sports however they are self funded and not under the National Training Centre banner.

Former sports programs
Up until 2013, the AIS offered scholarships to athletes across 36 programs in 26 different sports:
 Artistic gymnastics, athletes with disabilities - swimming, athletics and winter sports, basketball, netball, rowing, football (men & women), tennis, swimming, track and field, volleyball (men) and water polo (women) administered from Canberra
 Diving, squash, softball and cricket (men & women) administered from Brisbane
 Sailing and slalom canoeing administered from Sydney
 Hockey administered from Perth
 Sprint canoeing, triathlon and BMX administered from the Gold Coast
 Road cycling, track cycling and beach volleyball administered from Adelaide
 Australian rules football, rugby union and rugby league are camps based programs
 Winter sports (in partnership with the Olympic Winter Institute of Australia) administered from Melbourne
Sports that previously had an AIS program but were discontinued prior to 2013 included: weightlifting, water polo (men), volleyball (women), wrestling, shooting, archery, boxing (1997 - 2010) and golf. .

The head coach for the AIS boxing program from 1997 to 2010 was Bodo Andreass.

Notable athletes

Many prominent Australian athletes have taken up AIS scholarships. In 2001, the AIS established the Best of the Best Award to recognise highly performed AIS athletes. As of 2011, the following athletes have been recognised - Alisa Camplin, Robert De Castella, John Eales, Simon Fairweather, Neil Fuller, Bridgette Gusterson, Rechelle Hawkes, Shane Kelly, Luc Longley, Michelle Martin, Glenn McGrath, Michael Klim, Michael Milton, Clint Robinson, Louise Sauvage, Kate Slatter, Zali Steggall, Mark Viduka, Vicki Wilson, Todd Woodbridge, Lauren Jackson, Chantelle Newbery, Petria Thomas, Kerry Saxby-Junna, Jamie Dwyer, Anna Meares, Malcolm Page, Ricky Ponting, Oenone Wood and Matthew Cowdrey. In August 2013, Stuart O'Grady was indefinitely suspended from the 'Best of the Best' due to his admission to doping in 1998.

The Australian Institute of Sport Alumni highlights the many prominent Australian athletes that the AIS has assisted.

Athlete of the Year 
Since 1984, the AIS has named an Athlete of the Year. For the first twenty years, the award was predominately made to one athlete only. In 2004 a male and female athlete were awarded with the accolade; and the awarding has varied over the ensuing years.

Notable coaches

AIS was established to provide high level coaching to Australian athletes. Since its establishment in 1981, the AIS has employed highly credentialed Australian and international coaches. Original coaches were - Bill Sweetenham and Dennis Pursley (swimming), Wilma Shakespear in netball, Adrian Hurley and Patrick Hunt (basketball), Peter Lloyd and Kazuyu Honda (gymnastics), Jimmy Shoulder (football), Ray Ruffels and Helen Gourlay (tennis), Kelvin Giles, Gary Knoke and Merv Kemp (track and field), and Lyn Jones (weightlifting).

Other notable AIS coaches - Charlie Walsh (cycling), Barry Dancer and Richard Charlesworth(hockey), Terry Gathercole (swimming), Marty Clarke (basketball).

Sports medicine and sport science
AIS established sports medicine and sports science services and research programs when established in 1981. Dr Dick Telford was its first Co-ordinator of Sports Science and Medicine. Other notable staff have included: Dr Peter Fricker, Professor Allan Hahn, Professor Louise Burke, Dr Bruce Mason and Keith Lyons.

The current Chief Medical Officer of the AIS is Dr David Hughes. The AIS Sports Medicine department in 2020 released guidelines on the management of COVID-19 in athletes and a template for return to sport in Australia after the Coronavirus lockdown. These guidelines were used by the Australian government National Cabinet and the various Australian state governments to recommend stages for recommencing sport after the vast majority closed down in late March-early May 2020. Generally the doctors working at the AIS have been sports medicine specialists qualified through the Australasian College of Sport and Exercise Physicians.

In March 2022 the AIS released the National High Performance Sport Research Agenda, designed to prioritise resources in areas of critical importance to Australia's high performance sport system. In July 2022 the AIS awarded grants to six Australian research teams, aimed at optimising the performance of alite athletes, coaches and support staff. The document "Recommendations for conducting AIS-supported research in high performance sport" was also released in 2022.

Olympic Winter Institute of Australia

The AIS and the Australian Olympic Committee formed the Australian Institute of Winter Sports after the 1998 Winter Olympics. The organisation was renamed to the Olympic Winter Institute of Australia on 1 July 2001. It provides training in alpine skiing, freestyle skiing (including aerial and mogul), snowboarding, short track speed skating and figure skating. It is also a partner with the AIS in skeleton (toboganning).

Basketball program 

The AIS Men's Basketball Program played in the South East Australian Basketball League (SEABL) between 1982 and 2010. The team was coached by Patrick Hunt from 1982 to 1992, then Gordie McLeod (1993–97), Frank Arsego (1998–2002), and Marty Clarke (2003–10). They made the playoffs just six times, but behind coach Arsego and future NBA champion Andrew Bogut, the AIS won the 2002 East Conference championship. They went on to lose 98–93 to the Hobart Chargers in the 2002 National Championship game. Following the 2010 season, the program had a change of direction and withdrew from the SEABL. In 2014, after Basketball Australia assumed responsibility of the AIS basketball program, the program returned to the SEABL under a new moniker, the Basketball Australia National Centre of Excellence (BA CoE) Men's Team.

The AIS women's team originally played in the WNBL from 1983 to 2012, before being resurrected in 2014 alongside the men's Basketball Australia National Centre of Excellence team, thus entering the SEABL for the first time.

Both teams were ineligible for the playoffs between 2014 and 2017 due to not playing full seasons. With a change to playing full seasons in 2018, both teams became eligible for the playoffs for the first time. Following the demise of the SEABL, both BA Centre of Excellence teams played in the inaugural NBL1 season in 2019.

In 2020 and 2021, both BA Centre of Excellence teams competed in the Waratah League. The men's team were crowned co-champions of the 2021 season.

In 2022, both BA Centre of Excellence teams were entered into the NBL1 as part of a Wildcard conference playing against the top teams from all five NBL1 State Conferences.

In 2023, both BA Centre of Excellence teams will play in the NBL1 East.

References

Bibliography
 Daly, John, Quest for Excellence : the Australian Institute of Sport, Australian Government Publishing Service, Canberra, 1991
 Australian Sports Commission, Excellence : the Australian Institute of Sport. 2nd ed. Canberra, Australian Sports Commission, 2002.
 Bloomfield, John, Australia's sporting success : the inside story, UNSW Press, Sydney, 2003
 Ferguson, Jim, More than sunshine and vegemite : success the Australian way, Halstead Press, Sydney, 2007

External links
 
 Australian Institute of Sport Annual Report 1981-1988
 Australian Sports Commission Annual Reports include AIS activities since 1988.
  Sports funding: federal balancing act –Detailed summary of Australian Government funding and policies related to sport

 
National Institutes of Sport
Sport in Canberra
Education in Australia
Sports organisations of Australia
1981 establishments in Australia